Abeceda may refer to:
 Czech orthography
 Slovene alphabet
 Slovak orthography
 Gaj's Latin alphabet